The Stanley Baxter Picture Show is a British comedy television show which was originally broadcast on ITV. It featured an initial series of four episodes in 1972, followed by one-off specials in each of the successive years. A sketch show it largely followed the same format of Baxter's successful BBC series The Stanley Baxter Show.

The show has a focus on parodying popular films and television series, with Baxter sometimes playing several roles in a single show. Amongst other hit ITV shows that Baxter did impressions of were The Benny Hill Show and Upstairs, Downstairs.

References

Bibliography
 Barfe, Louis. Turned Out Nice Again: The Story of British Light Entertainment. Atlantic Books Ltd, 2013.

External links
 

1972 British television series debuts
1975 British television series endings
1970s British comedy television series
ITV sketch shows
English-language television shows
1970s British television sketch shows
London Weekend Television shows